Fénix Cooperativa Cinematográfica is a Spanish production company based in Madrid known for The Lady Doctor (1958).

It produced Night of the Blood Monster (1970) along the Italian Prodimex Film, the Spanish-Italian-German-British film Count Dracula (1970) along Towers of London, Corona Filmproduktion and Filmar Compagnia Cinematografica, and Brandy (1963) by José Luis Borau and Mario Caiano. It also produced ¿Por qué morir en Madrid? (1966), by Eduardo Manzanos.

Filmography

References

Bibliography
 

Film production companies of Spain
Companies based in Madrid
Television production companies of Spain
Defunct film and television production companies